Trisopterus is a genus of small cods, family Gadidae. They are native to the northeastern Atlantic Ocean including the Mediterranean Sea.

Species
There are currently four recognized species in this genus:
 Trisopterus capelanus (Lacepède, 1800)
 Trisopterus esmarkii (Nilsson, 1855) (Norway pout)
 Trisopterus luscus (Linnaeus, 1758) (pouting)
 Trisopterus minutus (Linnaeus, 1758) (poor cod)

Trisopterus capelanus was until recently (2011) considered to be a subspecies of Trisopterus minutus, but both genetic and morphometric data clearly support the status of Trisopterus capelanus as a separate species.

References

Gadidae
Marine fish genera
Taxa named by Constantine Samuel Rafinesque
Ray-finned fish genera